Robert "Bob" Boucher (born 12 June 1943) is a Canadian former cyclist and speed skater. 

In December 1962, he went to Europe as part of the national team composing of eight Canadian speed skaters, for a six-week training project in Sweden. At that time he lived in Winnipeg. He competed in the cycling sprint event at the 1968 Summer Olympics and the 500m speed skating event at the 1968 Winter Olympics.

Boucher was inducted into the Manitoba Sports Hall of Fame in 1994 for speed skating.

References

External links
 

1943 births
Living people
Canadian male cyclists
Canadian male speed skaters
Olympic cyclists of Canada
Olympic speed skaters of Canada
Cyclists at the 1968 Summer Olympics
Speed skaters at the 1968 Winter Olympics
Speed skaters from Winnipeg
Sportspeople from Halifax, Nova Scotia
20th-century Canadian people